Visuals is the seventh studio album by Danish alternative rock band Mew. It was released on 28 April 2017. First single "85 Videos" was released together with a music video on 16 February. It is the first Mew album not to feature guitarist Bo Madsen, who left the band after their previous album, + -, was released in 2015.

Critical reception

Upon its release, the album received favourable reviews from music critics. At Metacritic, which assigns a normalized rating out of 100 to reviews from mainstream critics, the album received an average score of 74, based on 9 reviews.

Track listing

Personnel
Mew
Jonas Bjerre – vocals, keyboards, guitar
Johan Wohlert – bass, backing vocals, guitar
Silas Utke Graae Jørgensen – drums, percussion

Additional personnel
Mads Wegner – additional guitar
Marius Neset – saxophone
Bo Rande – trumpet, flugelhorn
Sasha Ryabina – backing vocals

Charts

Release history

References

2017 albums
Mew (band) albums
PIAS Recordings albums